Pettit is an unincorporated community and census-designated place (CDP) in Cherokee County, Oklahoma, United States. The population was 954 at the 2010 census, a 23.7 percent increase over the figure of 771 recorded in 2000. The town was named for Mark and Eliza Pettit, townsite allottees.

Geography
Pettit is located at  (35.755558, -94.949116).

The community borders Lake Tenkiller on the southeast, and Pettit Bay Public Use Area is across the lake arm from Pettit.

Demographics

As of the census of 2000, there were 771 people, 329 households, and 227 families residing in the CDP. The population density was 66.6 people per square mile (25.7/km2). There were 459 housing units at an average density of 39.7/sq mi (15.3/km2). The racial makeup of the CDP was 64.46% White, 0.13% African American, 24.38% Native American, 0.13% from other races, and 10.89% from two or more races. Hispanic or Latino of any race were 1.04% of the population.

There were 329 households, out of which 27.7% had children under the age of 18 living with them, 57.1% were married couples living together, 8.5% had a female householder with no husband present, and 31.0% were non-families. 27.1% of all households were made up of individuals, and 10.6% had someone living alone who was 65 years of age or older. The average household size was 2.34 and the average family size was 2.84.

In the CDP, the population was spread out, with 22.7% under the age of 18, 6.2% from 18 to 24, 25.9% from 25 to 44, 28.1% from 45 to 64, and 17.0% who were 65 years of age or older. The median age was 42 years. For every 100 females, there were 104.5 males. For every 100 females age 18 and over, there were 104.8 males.

The median income for a household in the CDP was $25,766, and the median income for a family was $26,806. Males had a median income of $25,536 versus $21,250 for females. The per capita income for the CDP was $14,432. About 12.7% of families and 15.3% of the population were below the poverty line, including 20.5% of those under age 18 and 8.9% of those age 65 or over.

References

Census-designated places in Oklahoma
Census-designated places in Cherokee County, Oklahoma